Deimantė Cornette (born Deimantė Daulytė; 22 February 1989, in Šiauliai) is a Lithuanian chess player who holds the FIDE titles of International Master and Woman Grandmaster. She played for France from 2021.

She won the women's Lithuanian Chess Championship in 2006, 2007, 2008, 2012 and 2013.

In March 2015, Deimantė won the Mediterranean Flower round-robin tournament in Rijeka. In the following month, she competed in the Women's World Chess Championship 2015, where she lost in dramatic style in the 1st round. Her opponent was Monika Soćko. After drawing the first 2 games, it went to a tie-break. Deimante won the first rapid chess game. In the 2nd game of the tie-break, she reached a position where she could checkmate the king in 1 move. Instead of playing the winning move though, she played a move that lost her her queen. As a result, she lost that game. She didn't recover from that, and lost the next 2 games as well.

Family 
Her spouse is French GM Matthieu Cornette (b. 1985).

References

External links 

Deimante Daulyte chess games at 365Chess.com

1989 births
Living people
Chess International Masters
Chess woman grandmasters
French female chess players
Lithuanian female chess players
Sportspeople from Šiauliai